AVQ may refer to:

 AVQ (airport), American general aviation airport
 AVQ (company), French software company